Vera Zvonareva was the defending champion and she defended the title, defeating Tamarine Tanasugarn in the final, 6–4, 6–4.

Seeds

Draw

Finals

Top half

Bottom half

External links
Main Draw
Qualifying Draw

Singles
PTT Pattaya Open - Singles
 in women's tennis